Un Pedacito De Mi (Eng. A little piece of me) is the fourth album from Mexican pop music singer and actress Lucerito. It was released on 1986. In this album, it can be found the collaboration of  the popular Mexican singer Luis Miguel with the song "Todo el Amor del Mundo", which was part of the soundtrack of the motion picture Fiebre de amor.

Track listing

Singles

Sales
The album has sold 300,000 units thus far, 60,000 of which have been sold in Mexico.

References

1986 albums
Lucero (entertainer) albums